The Himachal Pradesh Football League was founded by Himachal Pradesh Football Association (HPFA) in 2020 as the top state-level football league in the Indian state of Himachal Pradesh. The league is top tier of the state and the 4th tier in Indian football league system.

A total of 10 teams compete in the league, which are divided into two groups of 5, with the table-toppers from each group advancing into the final. The inaugural edition commenced on 25 November 2020.

Current teams
A total of 10 teams participated in the Inaugural season.

League champions

See also
Himachal Pradesh Football Association

References

External links
Himachal Football League at The Away End

Football in Himachal Pradesh
4
Sports leagues established in 2020